Stephen Brent Lowery (born October 12, 1960) is an American professional golfer.

Lowery was born in Birmingham, Alabama. He has PGA Tour victories in 1994, 2000 and 2008. All three of his victories on the PGA Tour have come in playoffs.

Lowery has been featured in the top 50 of the Official World Golf Ranking. His best season on the PGA Tour was in 1994, when he finished 12th on the money list. He missed most of 2007 with a wrist injury. The PGA Tour granted him a partial exemption for the 2008 season. He needed to win more than $250,000 during his first eight starts in 2008 in order to re-gain his full exemption on the PGA Tour, but that became a moot point when he won the 2008 AT&T Pebble Beach National Pro-Am. The victory gave him a full two-year exemption.

Lowery also won the Birmingham Golf Association Junior and State Junior in the late 1970s, before embarking on his four years of college at the University of Alabama. He played for coach Conrad Rehling from 1979-1983, on the Alabama Crimson Tide golf team.

Though it was in a losing effort, Lowery played a memorable stretch of golf at The International in 2002. He began his comeback by getting up and down from the water on a "splash" shot, leading to a birdie. He holed out a shot from over 200 yards for a rare double eagle (or albatross) on the 71st hole to pull within one point, ultimately losing by the same margin after missing a birdie putt on the last hole. Coming near the very end of the tournament and creating such a close finish, Lowery's double eagle was one of the most dramatic in PGA Tour history since Gene Sarazen made a double eagle at 15 in the final round of the 1935 Masters Tournament. Two holes before his double eagle, Lowery also holed out a wedge from the fairway for an eagle.

Amateur wins
this list may be incomplete
1982 Southern Amateur

Professional wins (4)

PGA Tour wins (3)

PGA Tour playoff record (3–0)

Ben Hogan Tour wins (1)

Ben Hogan Tour playoff record (1–0)

Results in major championships

CUT = missed the half-way cut
"T" = tied

Summary

Most consecutive cuts made – 5 (twice)
Longest streak of top-10s – 1 (three times)

Results in The Players Championship

CUT = missed the halfway cut
WD = withdrew
DQ = disqualified
"T" indicates a tie for a place

Results in World Golf Championships

1Cancelled due to 9/11

QF, R16, R32, R64 = Round in which player lost in match play
"T" = Tied
NT = No tournament

See also
1987 PGA Tour Qualifying School graduates
1992 Ben Hogan Tour graduates

References

External links

American male golfers
Alabama Crimson Tide men's golfers
PGA Tour golfers
PGA Tour Champions golfers
Korn Ferry Tour graduates
Golfers from Birmingham, Alabama
1960 births
Living people